Daud Ali Khan Bahadur was Nawab of Masulipatam in India. He was son of Nawab Muhammad Ali Khan Bahadur.

Official name royal nawab
His official name was Rustam Jah, Najm ud-Daula, Nawab Daud 'Ali Khan Bahadur, Intizam Jang, of Masulipatam.

Marriage

Death
He died in 1883. He was succeeded by his elder son, Nawab Husain Ali Khan Bahadur.

Titles held

See also
Nawab of Carnatic
Nawab of Banganapalle

References

Nawabs of India
1883 deaths
Year of birth unknown